Garrus ware is a type of Iranian ceramics, named after a district southwest of the Caspian Sea, where examples were reportedly found.

Notes 

Iranian pottery